Lilli Lehmann, born Elisabeth Maria Lehmann, later Elisabeth Maria Lehmann-Kalisch (24 November 1848 – 17 May 1929) was a German operatic dramatic coloratura soprano. She was also a voice teacher.

Biography

The future opera star's father, Karl-August Lehmann, was a singer (Heldentenor) while her mother, Maria Theresia Löw (1809–1885), was a soprano. Her younger sister, Marie, also went on to become an operatic soprano. Her first lessons were from her mother, who had been a prima donna under Spohr at the Cassel opera. After singing small parts on the stage, for example in Mozart's Magic Flute at Prague in 1866, and studies under Heinrich Laube in Leipzig, Lehmann made her proper debut in 1870 in Berlin as a light soprano in Meyerbeer's Das Feldlager in Schlesien. She subsequently became so successful that she was appointed an Imperial Chamber Singer for life in 1876.

Lehmann sang in the first Bayreuth Festival in 1876, singing in the first complete performances of The Ring Cycle as Woglinde and Helmwige. She performed in London in 1884, and appeared at the New York Metropolitan Opera in 1885–1899. Together with her Met colleagues  Fischer, Alvary, Brandt, and Seidl, she helped to popularise Wagner's music in America. By remaining in America beyond the leave granted her by the Berlin Opera, she faced a ban following her return to Germany. After the personal intervention of the Emperor, the ban was lifted.

She appeared at London's Royal Opera House, Covent Garden, in 1899 and sang in Paris and Vienna in 1903 and 1909 respectively. In 1905, she sang at the Salzburg Festival, later becoming the festival's artistic director. Lehmann was also renowned as a Lieder singer. She continued to give recitals until her retirement from the concert stage in the 1920s.

Her mature voice, of splendid quality and large volume, gained for her the reputation of being not only one of the greatest Wagnerian singers of her day but also an ideal interpreter of Bellini's Norma and the operatic music of Mozart. She was considered unsurpassed in the roles of Brünnhilde and Isolde but sang an astonishingly wide array of other parts. Indeed, across the span of her career, she performed 170 different parts in a total of 119 German, Italian and French operas. She was noted not only for her rendering of the musical score, but also as a tragic actress. 

She was also a noted voice teacher. Among her pupils were the famous sopranos Geraldine Farrar, Viorica Ursuleac, Edytha Fleischer, Olive Fremstad; the mezzo-sopranos Lula Mysz-Gmeiner and Marion Telva; and the contralto and composer Florence Wickham. Longtime Juilliard School professor of voice Lucia Dunham, who trained many other famous singers, was also one of her pupils.

Lehmann founded the International Summer Academy at the Mozarteum in Salzburg in 1916. The academy's curriculum concentrated on voice lessons at first but it was extended later to include a wide variety of musical instruction.

The Lilli Lehmann Medal is awarded by the Mozarteum in her honour. Her voice can be heard on CD reissues of the recordings which she made prior to World War I. Although past her peak as an operatic singer when she made these records, they still impress.

Personal life

In 1888, she married the tenor Paul Kalisch. Lehmann became a vegetarian in 1896. She stated that it improved her career and health and she no longer suffered from fatigue or headaches. Her diet consisted of fruit, rice, milk, eggs, cheese, vegetables and rye bread, although she admitted she ate fish twice a year. Rupert Christiansen has described Lehmann as a "fanatic vegetarian and anti-vivisectionist, and nothing pleased her more in New York than the fact that the whipping of horses was forbidden."  She also campaigned against the use of feathers from exotic birds in women's hats and costume, and after her operatic performances she would offer her autograph to women who promised not to wear feathers in their hats.

Publications
 Meine Gesangskunst. Berlin: 1902. 3rd edition, 1922.
 How to Sing. New York: Macmillan, 1902. 3rd edition, 1924, republished: Mineola, N.Y.: Dover, 1993. (English version of Meine Gesangskunst) Translation: Richard Aldrich.
 L. Andro, Lilli Lehmann (Berlin: 1907)
 Lilli Lehmann, Mein Weg. Autobiography. (Leipzig, 1913; English translation by Alice B. Seligman, My Path Through Life, New York: 1914)
 Mozartkurse. In: Mozarteums-Mitteilungen, vol. 1, Salzburg, 1918/19, pp. 6 – 9 (online)
 Die Salzburger Don Juan-Aufführungen im Jahre 1906. In: Mozarteums-Mitteilungen, vol. 3, Salzburg, 1920/21, pp. 15 – 25 (online)

Citations

References

External links
 
 Lilli Lehmann collection, 1865-1927 Library of Congress
 
  
 
 
 

1848 births
1929 deaths
19th-century German women opera singers
20th-century German women opera singers
Anti-vivisectionists
German autobiographers
German operatic sopranos
German people of Jewish descent
Metropolitan Opera people
Musicians from Würzburg
Vocal coaches
Voice teachers
Women autobiographers
Women music educators